Thomas James Reeves, born in Thomaston, Connecticut, December 9, 1895, was a US Navy radioman who became the namesake of the destroyer escort . Reeves was killed during the Japanese surprise attack on Pearl Harbor on December 7, 1941, and posthumously received the Medal of Honor.

Military service
Thomas Reeves enlisted in the United States Naval Reserve as Electrician third class on July 20, 1917. Released from duty July 21, 1919, he was recalled to active duty and was transferred to the regular Navy April 16, 1920 and served until discharged August 21, 1921. On October 12, 1921, he re-enlisted in the Navy making it his career.

Advanced through the rates to chief radioman, Reeves was serving aboard the battleship  when the Japanese attacked Pearl Harbor, December 7, 1941. During that attack the mechanized ammunition hoists in the battleship were put out of commission. Reeves "... on his own initiative, in a burning passageway, assisted in the maintenance of an ammunition supply by hand to the antiaircraft guns until he was overcome by smoke and fire which resulted in his death." For his distinguished conduct, RMC Reeves posthumously received the Medal of Honor.

Namesake
In 1943, the destroyer escort  was named in his honor.

Medal of Honor citation
Citation:

For distinguished conduct in the line of his profession, extraordinary courage and disregard of his own safety during the attack on the Fleet in Pearl Harbor, by Japanese forces on 7 December 1941. After the mechanized ammunition hoists were put out of action in the U.S.S. California, Reeves, on his own initiative, in a burning passageway, assisted in the maintenance of an ammunition supply by hand to the antiaircraft guns until he was overcome by smoke and fire, which resulted in his death.

See also

List of Medal of Honor recipients

References

External links

1895 births
1941 deaths
Deaths by Japanese airstrikes during the attack on Pearl Harbor
United States Navy Medal of Honor recipients
United States Navy reservists
United States Navy sailors
United States Navy personnel killed in World War II
World War II recipients of the Medal of Honor
Deaths from asphyxiation
Military personnel from Connecticut
Burials in the National Memorial Cemetery of the Pacific